Dungtláng is an Indian village within Khawbung rural development block in Champhai district, Mizoram.

References

Villages in Khawbung block
Champhai